Alexandria Hall-Louisiana College is a Classical Revival structure built in 1920, located in Pineville, Louisiana. Alexandria Hall was named to honor the people of Alexandria, Louisiana.

Alexandria Hall was added to the National Register of Historic Places on May 15, 1986.

References

University and college buildings on the National Register of Historic Places in Louisiana
Neoclassical architecture in Louisiana
Buildings and structures completed in 1920
Buildings and structures in Rapides Parish, Louisiana
Pineville, Louisiana
National Register of Historic Places in Rapides Parish, Louisiana